John D'Agostino (born November 3, 1982) is an American professional poker player.
D'Agostino plays online at Full Tilt Poker as one of their "Full Tilt Pros" 
As of 2010, his total live tournament winnings exceed $1,600,000.

D'Agostino placed 5th in the second season World Poker Tour (WPT) PokerStars Caribbean Poker Adventure event, winning $99,450.

At the 2004 United States Poker Championship, he had a huge chip lead heading into the final table. However, a bad beat against Hoyt Corkins (which prompted D'Agostino to angrily push his chip Corkins' way) led to D'Agostino's pocket 10s losing to quad 7s, leaving John with just one chip before he was eliminated in 6th place.

He made a second WPT final table in the fourth season Borgata Poker Open event, where he finished in 4th place, earning $349,685. Later in the season he finished 2nd to Michael "The Grinder" Mizrachi in the 2006 Borgata Winter Poker Open, earning $591,312.

Personal life
D'Agostino is from Seymour, Connecticut. He had previously lived in Egg Harbor City, New Jersey.

Notes

External links
Official Site

1982 births
American poker players
Living people
People from Egg Harbor City, New Jersey